The National Law Review is an American law journal, daily legal news website and legal analysis content-aggregating database. In both 2020 and 2021, the National Law Review published over 20,000 legal news articles and experienced an uptick in readership averaging 4.3 million readers in both March and April 2020, due to the demand for news regarding the COVID-19 Pandemic.  The site offers hourly legal news updates and analysis of recent court decisions, regulatory changes and legislative actions and includes a combinations of original content and content submitted by various professionals in the legal and business communities. The online version of The National Law Review was started as a research tool by a group of corporate attorneys looking to store and classify useful and reputable legal analysis and news they located on the internet.  The National Law Review has grown to one of the most widely read business law websites in the United States.

The on-line version contains primarily attorney-authored articles, podcasts, and videos, and specializes in US business law news and analysis. Though submissions on regulatory changes and state and federal court rulings, slowed somewhat in 2022, from their peak during the height of the COVID crisis and the turbulence of the Trump Administration to an average of 350 new articles per week. The journal specializes in business and commercial issues, such as banking law, financial regulation, tax law, consumer protection and product liability, and intellectual property issues such as copyright, trademark, and patents. Other legal fields discussed by the National Law Review include civil procedure, criminal law, environment law, family law, health law, insurance law, property law, and torts.

History and Evolution

Monthly Print National Law Review

The National Law Review print edition was founded in 1888 in Philadelphia by publishers and book sellers Kay & Brother who initially specialized in publishing analysis on Pennsylvania legal developments authored by practicing attorneys . The print edition National Law Review was a monthly scholarly law review which included sections such as Current Legal News, a Book Review section, a Digest of Important Decisions which summarized recent judicial decisions in various states, and a section devoted to Current Legal Thought organized by legal topic. 

The National Law Review premiered during an era when legal news and analysis resources authored by practitioners were considered an "almost indispensable auxiliary to the profession"  and forty-two new law journals began in United States in the 1870s alone and even more in the 1880s.  Academic law reviews continued going strong but few of the local law focused and attorney authored publications survived after West Publishing began to dominate the legal publishing market in the early 1900s by eliminating  or consolidating numerous local legal reporters and many of the attorney authored law reviews. Historically, articles in law reviews were often considered a persuasive authority in American courts, though this influence is generally thought to be waning in recent years.

Daily Legal News Website

The on-line edition of The National Law Review was developed in Chicago, Illinois by corporate attorney Jennifer Schaller and other in-house attorneys and internet professionals in order to provide an easily accessible and reliable resource of litigation and regulatory news articles written by vetted experts analyzing legal news and trends. The on-line edition has been described as more straightforward, practical and informative than a traditional law review, containing information of potential interest to both legal and business professionals, and it often serves as a reference source to other legal periodicals. In addition to serving as a source on emerging American legal issues to mainstream media, the National Law Review provides several services of interest to practicing lawyers and law students, running, for example, a law student writing competition that has published articles on multiple areas of the law  and since 2018 has honored approximately 75 noteworthy legal authors each year, which is less than 1% of the journal's contributing authors through the National Law Review's Go To Thought Leadership Awards.  In 2021, NLR's editorial team launched the Legal News Reach podcast, which primarily focuses on law office management and legal marketing trends as well as other topical legal news. 

In 2020, the National Law Review was  certified by Women's Business Enterprise National Council (WBENC) as a U.S. Small Business Administration as a Women-Owned Small Business (WOSB) which is a business that is at least 51% owned and operated on a daily basis by one or more female U.S Citizens. Additionally, in both 2020 and 2021, the National Law Review exceeded 25 million pageviews and in January 2021, the news website specifically recognized law firm authors who contributed Coronavirus legal news with an exceptionally high number of readers and that were regularly cited by other news outlets as COVID-19 legal resource materials.

References

External links

Official website

American law journals
English-language journals
Publications established in 1888
Databases in the United States
Law databases
American news websites